Northbrook School District 28 is an elementary school district situated in Northbrook, Illinois.

Schools
Meadowbrook Elementary School - Grades K-5
Greenbriar Elementary School - Grades K-5
Westmoor Elementary School - Grades P-5
Northbrook Junior High School - Grades 6-8
Westmoor

Westmoor is a school which goes through preschool to 5th grade it located on cherry lane. It recently went under construction starting in 2014. The school first started resorting the 4-5th grade hall ways. In the summer of 2014 they repainted all the walls and removed all of the carpet. The reason for this is that the carpets were moldy and were going to cause a problem later on. Late 2014 westmoor's principal Dr. Finch announced that the school was going to remake the playground. The back of the school was still under construction. In result the school had to put fences for safety reasons. Middle of 2015 they removed half of the playground to make room for a spider web and spin top. Construction was finally finished the last week before the school year ended on June 5th 2015. A big edition to the school is the new preschool rooms on the east side of the school it used to be a kindergarten class's playground and classrooms. The kindergartens now have 2 rooms on another side of the building.

NBJH 
-Currently teaching over 600 students as of 2011-2012

-Currently over 210 students in 6th grade as of 2014-2015
Northbrook, Illinois
School districts in Cook County, Illinois

-Currently Northbrook Junior High (NBJH) has over 500 student from grade level 6-8 as of 2016

External links
 Northbrook School District 28